Dębno  is a town in Myślibórz County, West Pomeranian Voivodeship in western Poland. As of December 2021, the town has a population of 13,443.

After the Migration Period, the area was populated by West Slavic peoples since the 6th century. Later, it was invaded by Saxons immediately after the invasion and annexation of the Catholic Duchy of Kopanica. The castle of Dębno belonged to the House of Odrowąż.

Dębno is known for hosting the oldest marathon in Poland (since 1969), one of the five marathons included in the Crown of Polish Marathons, along with marathons in Kraków, Poznań, Warsaw and Wrocław.

The Dębno oil field is located near the town.

Notable residents
 Franz Alexander von Kleist (1769-1797), poet
 Franz Hilgendorf (1839–1904), zoologist and paleontologist
 Friedrich W. K. Müller (1863–1930), German scholar of oriental cultures and languages
 Arthur Hübner (1885–1937) a German philologist, researched German literature from the Middle Ages
 Antoni Dobrowolski (1904–2012) a Polish educator and the oldest known survivor of Auschwitz
 Joanna Szarawaga (born 1994) a Polish handballer for GTPR Gdynia and the Polish national team

International relations

Dębno signed partnership agreements with:
  Strausberg, Germany (1978)
  Renkum, Netherlands (1990)
  Tczew, Poland (2000)
  Terezín, Czech Republic (2003)
  Nowy Tomyśl, Poland (2010)
  Grodzisk Wielkopolski, Poland (2022)
  Postomino, Poland (2022)

See also
 Coat of arms of Dębno

References

External links
 Official town webpage
 Jewish Community in Dębno on Virtual Shtetl

Cities and towns in West Pomeranian Voivodeship
Myślibórz County